Synthlipsis may refer to:
 Synthlipsis (bug), a genus of true bugs in the family Miridae
 Synthlipsis (plant), a genus of flowering plants in the family Brassicaceae